Anthony Lee Adams (born March 9, 1950) is an American former gridiron football player, a quarterback in the World Football League (WFL), National Football League (NFL), and Canadian Football League (CFL).

College career
Adams played college football at Utah State in Logan from 1970 through 1972. Prior to that he'd been with the Texas Longhorns Football on their freshman team in 1968 and then at Riverside Community College in 1969. With the Aggies, he was the starting quarterback for three years, and the team had a record of 21 wins, 11 losses, and 1 tie.  He didn't miss any games, playing in all 33 contests.

As a senior in 1972, Adams set an NCAA record on November 11 with 561 net passing yards and five touchdowns in a 44–16 Aggie win over the Utah Utes. The teams combined for an NCAA record 950 passing yards, and Adams' 561 yards stood for five years, until broken by BYU's Marc Wilson in 1977, also against Utah. The head coach that worked with Adams for all 3 seasons was Chuck Mills; Adams' number 11 jersey was retired by Utah State in 1972.

Adams' final game for Utah State was at home against Weber State on Thanksgiving. Seldom-injured, he left the game early in the first quarter with a lower leg injury, hobbled around the sidelines, and changed into his street clothes at halftime. When the Aggies fell behind early in the fourth quarter, Adams got back in uniform and re-entered the game.

NCAA statistics

Professional career
Adams was selected in the 1973 NFL Draft by the San Diego Chargers in the 14th round (343rd overall), but he never actually played for the team that drafted him.

Hartford Knights
His first actual professional season began with the Hartford Knights of the Atlantic Coast Football League. He played with them in 1973, recording 10 passing touchdowns.

Southern California Sun
he played with the Southern California Sun in the World Football League (WFL) in 1974, where he statistically had his best pro season, completing 276 of 510 passes for 3905 yards and 23 TDs and 18 interceptions. He was an All-WFL selection that season. He was also named one of the WFL's Tri-MVP's during the 1974 season. He shared this award with Tommy Reamon of the Florida Blazers and J.J. Jennings of the Memphis Southmen. Adams led the Sun to a 13-7 record and the team won the 1974 WFL Western Division. They faced the Hawaiians in the opening round of the '74 WFL playoffs and fell by a score of 32–14.

Kansas City Chiefs
Adams began his career in the NFL in 1975 with the Kansas City Chiefs.  During his four years with the Chiefs, he appeared in 50 games, 7 of them as the starting quarterback.  He was never able to reach the success that he had in the WFL, winning only 1 of the 7 games that he started.  He completed 163 of 319 passing attempts for 2,126 yards, 9 TDs, and 22 interceptions. Adams would no longer be a member of the Chiefs after the 1978 season.

Toronto Argonauts
Adams played 20 games over two seasons (1979–1980) for the Toronto Argonauts of the CFL. His best year was 1979, when he completed 241 of 394 passes for 2,692 yards, with 13 touchdowns and 18 interceptions.

Minnesota Vikings
He finished his career as a strike replacement player with the Minnesota Vikings in 1987.  By this time, Adams was already 37 years old, and this stint with the Vikings didn't do much to revive his career.  This was the first playing time he saw since playing in his last season in the CFL in 1980.  He started in all 3 games that he played in for the Vikings, losing all three of those games.  He completed 49 of his 89 pass attempts for 607 yards while posting 3 Tds and 5 interceptions.

Professional statistics

WFL statistics

CFL statistics

NFL statistics

References

External links

1950 births
Living people
American football quarterbacks
Canadian football quarterbacks
Frankfurt Galaxy coaches
Kansas City Chiefs players
Minnesota Vikings players
NFL Europe (WLAF) coaches
Southern California Sun players
Toronto Argonauts players
Utah State Aggies football players
Sportspeople from San Antonio
Players of American football from San Antonio
National Football League replacement players
Players of Canadian football from San Antonio